Per Torsten Eklund (born 21 June 1946) is a Swedish Rally and Rallycross driver. His nickname is "Pekka". In rallying he never made it to the very top but he has been very successful in his later rallycross career.

Biography

Saab works drive
After his education as a driving instructor, together with later teammate Stig Blomqvist at the Kvinnersta Folkhögskola outside of Örebro, Eklund was a Saab factory driver from 1970 till 1979. In 1982, however, the year after Saab discontinued its official rallying involvement, he achieved the brand's last top position in a World Championship event, finishing fourth in the Swedish Rally driving a privately entered, Clarion-sponsored Saab 99 Turbo. He was always proud of that result, since the competition consisted mostly of four-wheel-drive cars, and the event was run in snow. This signified the end of the rally era at Saab, even though Eklund went on to drive an officially-entered Saab 900 Turbo in the British round of the 1997 World Rally Championship. He was Swedish Champion in 1978, beating his team mate Stig Blomqvist. In 1982 Eklund finished 5th overall of the FIA World Rally Championship for Drivers.

Rallycross
In 1971 Eklund started driving Rallycross at Valkenswaard in The Netherlands, and some months later he won the first ever Swedish Rallycross event at Hedemora, on 17 October 1971. He first drove a Saab 96 V4, in the early years of the Embassy/ERA European Rallycross Championship as teammate to his compatriot Stig Blomqvist. He was always prominent, became 7th overall respectively 4th overall in the first and second European Championship series of 1973 and 1974, but his greatest successes have been in later times. From the early 1990s till 2009, his last full season, he was one of the fastest competitors of the FIA European Championship for Rallycross Drivers. In 1999 Eklund claimed his first and only European title for Drivers of the Division 1, nowadays known as the SuperCars category.

Toyota
Eklund joined Toyota Team Europe in 1980, and gave the 2nd generation Celica's one of its best WRC result by finished second in the 1981 Rallye Côte d'Ivoire. He drove the Group B Celica Twincam Turbo TA64 in selected 1983 and 1984 World Rally Championship events. Eklund also rallied Group A Corolla AE86 and Celica Supra 2800 GT in the British Rally Championship.

Accomplishments 
FIA European Rallycross Champion 1999 with Saab 9-3 T16 4x4
2nd overall in the 1998, 2002 and 2003 FIA European Rallycross Championships
3rd overall in the 2000 and 2001 FIA European Rallycross Championships
Swedish Rallycross Champion 2004

Best international rally results (top three results only)

1969 
 Norwegian Winter Rally (N), 1st, Saab 96 V4, co-driver ?

1971 
 Norwegian Winter Rally (N), 1st, Saab 96 V4, co-driver ?

1972 
 Firestone Rally (E), 1st, Saab 96 V4, co-driver ?
 Dutch Texaco Rally (NL), 1st, Saab 96 V4, co-driver ?
 Österreichische Alpenfahrt (A), 3rd, Saab 96 V4, co-driver Bo Reinicke

1973 
 Swedish Rally (S), 2nd, Saab 96 V4, co-driver Rolf Carlsson
 Österreichische Alpenfahrt (A), 3rd, Saab 96 V4, co-driver Bo Reinicke

1976 
 Swedish Rally (S), 1st, Saab 96 V4, co-driver Björn Cederberg

1980 
 1000 Lakes Rally (FIN), 3rd, Triumph TR7 V8, co-driver Hans Sylvan

1981 
 Ivory Coast Rally (CI), 2nd, Toyota Celica 2000GT, co-driver Ragnar Spjuth

1982 
 Portugal Rally (P), 2nd, Toyota Celica 2000GT, co-driver Ragnar Spjuth
 Rally of New Zealand (NZ), 2nd, Toyota Celica 2000GT, co-driver Ragnar Spjuth
 Ivory Coast Rally (CI), 2nd, Toyota Celica 2000GT, co-driver Ragnar Spjuth

1983 
 Ivory Coast Rally (CI), 3rd, Toyota Celica TCT, co-driver Ragnar Spjuth

1984 
 Swedish Rally (S), 3rd, Audi quattro A2, co-driver Dave Whittock
 RAC Rally (GB), 3rd, Toyota Celica TCT, co-driver Dave Whittock

1988 
 Safari Rally (EAK), 3rd, Nissan 200SX, co-driver Dave Whittock

1989 
 Swedish Rally (S), 2nd, Lancia Delta HF integrale, co-driver Dave Whittock

1991 
 Hunsrück-Rallye (D), 3rd, Lancia Delta HF integrale 16V, co-driver Jan-Olof Bohlin

Pikes Peak 
 Pikes Peak International Hill Climb (USA): In 2000 Per Eklund achieved a record time of 11:21.58 in his Saab 9-3 Viggen 4x4 while racing the Pikes Peak Open category that was valid until being bettered in 2012 by Frenchman Romain Dumas.
 In 2002 Per Eklund took the Unlimited Class Victory. Eklund and his Saab's performance defeated the second place Unlimited Class entry and long-time Swedish rival Stig Blomqvist by over 34 seconds with a time of 11:13.20.

Trivia 
En får ente ge sej (Värmland dialect for "One must not give up") is Eklund's motto and the title of his biography. By Per Eklund & Anders Tunberg, 210 pages, Sportförlaget 1998,

Racing record

Complete WRC results

Complete FIA European Rallycross Cup results

Complete FIA European Rallycross Championship results

Division 2

Division 1*

* ''Division 2 was rebranded as Division 1 in 1997.

Supercar

Complete FIA World Rallycross Championship results

Supercar

External links 
 Per Eklund fan page 
 Rallybase profile

1946 births
Living people
People from Eda Municipality
Swedish rally drivers
World Rally Championship drivers
European Rallycross Championship drivers
World Rallycross Championship drivers
Sportspeople from Värmland County
Audi Sport drivers
Nismo drivers
Volkswagen Motorsport drivers